This is a list of notable Salvadoran Americans, including both original immigrants who obtained American citizenship and their American descendants.

To be included in this list, the person must have a Wikipedia article showing they are Salvadoran American or must have references showing they are Salvadoran American and are notable.

Athletes

Baseball players
 Steve Rodriguez - former second baseman/shortstop in Major League Baseball

Boxers
Carlos Hernández

Football players
 McLeod Bethel-Thompson - NFL quarterback 
José Cortéz - former NFL placekicker

Martial artists
 Edwin Figueroa - American mixed martial artist currently competing in the bantamweight division of the UFC

Soccer players

Arturo Alvarez
Efrain Burgos, Jr. - Salvadoran American; son of former footballer Efrain Burgos
Derby Carrillo
Dustin Corea
Joe Corona
Gerson Mayen
Carlos Menjívar
Edwin Miranda 
Hugo Pérez - former US national team player
Joshua Perez
Pablo Punyed
Steve Purdy 
Alex Roldan
Cristian Roldan
Ricardo Ulloa
Benji Villalobos
Eriq Zavaleta

Tennis players
Marcelo Arévalo
Rafael Arévalo
Rosemary Casals

Businesspeople and entrepreneurs
Abigail Folger - coffee heiress of Folgers; murdered by the Manson Family in 1969

Entertainment

Actors and actresses

Linda Arsenio
Adrian Bellani
Maurice Benard
Lisseth Chavez
J. R. Martinez
Rolando Molina
J. D. Pardo
Mari Possa
Ana Villafañe
Brennan Mejia

Authors and poets
 Consuelo de Saint Exupéry - writer, poet, sculptor, wife of French writer and pioneering aviator Antoine de Saint-Exupéry
 Jose B. Gonzalez - author of Toys Made of Rock
 Francisco Machón Vilanova - novelist
 Marcos Villatoro - novelist

Comedians
Julio Torres - comedian, writer for Saturday Night Live

Fashion
Francesca Miranda - fashion designer

Journalists
Markos Moulitsas - writer

Models

Marisela Demontecristo
Christy Turlington

Musicians and music groups

Joey Castillo - drummer for hard rock band Queens of the Stone Age and ex-drummer for Wasted Youth and Danzig
Cáthia - competitor on reality television singing competition The Voice
Fernando del Valle - operatic tenor
Allison Iraheta - singer; Telemundo's Quinceañera winner and American Idol season 8 finalist
DJ Keoki - techno DJ
Sabi - singer
Pete Sandoval - death metal drummer for Terrorizer and Morbid Angel
Denyse Tontz - American songwriter and performing artist
Álvaro Torres

Visual arts
 Edwin E. Aguilar - television animator, character layout artist, assistant director on The Simpsons 
Mario Bencastro - painter
RETNA - graffiti artist
Vivienne Medrano - animator, illustrator, comic creator, and voice actress

Political figures
 Hala Ayala - Virginia State Delegate for District 51 in Prince William County, Virginia; Father is Salvadoran though she doesn't speak Spanish. 
 Wendy Carrillo - California State Assemblywoman for District 51 in Los Angeles County, California
Liz Figueroa - Democratic politician and former California state senator
Ana Sol Gutierrez - former Maryland State Delegate for District 18 in Montgomery County, Maryland
 Monica Martinez - former State Senator for District 3 in Suffolk County, New York
Steve Montenegro - Republican member of the Arizona House of Representatives
Victor R. Ramirez - former State Senate for District 47 in Prince George's County, Maryland
Jessie Rodriguez - Republican representative of the Wisconsin State Assembly
John H. Sununu - former Republican Governor of New Hampshire; mother is Salvadoran, of Arab descent
Yesli Vega - Supervisor, Prince William County, Virginia and Republican nominee for Congress in Virginia’s 7th Congressional District.

Religion
Erwin McManus - lead pastor of Mosaic Church
Santiago Mellado - president of Willow Creek Association

Science and technology
Bernard Lewinsky - Salvadoran-born American physician and medical researcher; father of Monica Lewinsky
Francisco Rubio - NASA astronaut candidate
George Melendez Wright - biologist
Alicia Nash - mental health advocate and physicist; wife of John Forbes Nash Jr.

References

Salvadoran Americans

Americans
Salvadoran Americans
Salvadoran